Bixley is a former civil parish now in the parish of Caistor St Edmund and Bixley, in the South Norfolk district of Norfolk, England. According to the 2001 census and 2011 census it contained 60 households and a population of 144. It covered an area south of Norwich including the village of Arminghall. On 1 April 2019 the parish was merged with Caistor St Edmund to form Caistor St Edmund and Bixley.

The origin the name of Bixley has been studied in a paper by Keith Briggs; it means 'clearing in bushy land'. The name of Bixley near Ipswich has the same origin.

The parish church of St Wandregesilius dates from 1272. Wandregesilius is a Latinised form of Wandrille and it is the only church in England dedicated to this 7th-century Frankish abbot. In May 2004 it was set on fire by arsonists and gutted. The church had no electricity and used gas cylinders for heating which it is believed were used by vandals to start the fire. Near the church is Bixley medieval settlement, the site of a deserted medieval village.

Sir Timothy Colman lived in Bixley Manor in the grounds of which is the seven-storey stump of Bixley Tower Mill, dating from 1838. At eleven storeys this was once the tallest windmill in Norfolk and possibly the tallest in Britain. It was reduced to its current height in 1872.

References

External links

The Bixley Report on St Wandregesilius fire, written by J.R.A. Noyes of Cambridge University
St Wandregesilius on Norfolk Churches website
More photos from Flickr
Bixley Tower Mill
Bixley on Genuki

Former civil parishes in Norfolk
Deserted medieval villages in Norfolk
South Norfolk